The Personal System/2 or PS/2 was a line of personal computers developed by International Business Machines (IBM). Released in 1987, the PS/2 represented IBM's second generation of personal computer following the original IBM PC series, which was retired following IBM's announcement of the PS/2 in April 1987. Most PS/2s featured the Micro Channel architecture bus—a proprietary standard which was IBM's attempt at recapturing control of the PC market. However some PS/2 models at the low end featured ISA buses, which IBM included with their earlier PCs and which were widely cloned due to being a mostly-open standard. Many models of PS/2 were made, which came in the form of desktops, towers, portables, laptops and notebooks.

Notes
 Legend

 Explanatory notes
 Built-in or optional monitors are CRTs unless mentioned otherwise.
 The Space Saving Keyboard is a 87-key numpad-less version of the Model M.
 The 25 Collegiate, intended for college students, had two 720 KB floppy drives, maxed out the RAM to 640 KB, and came packaged with the official PS/2 Mouse, Windows 2.0, and four blank floppy disks.
 Financial workstations came packaged with a 50-key function keypad and were intended for use in banks.
 LS models are "diskless workstations": essentially the same as their non-LS counterparts but without floppy drives or hard drives and that connect to networks using Ethernet or Token Ring adapters.
 Ultimedia models shipped with a microphone and included SCSI CD-ROMs, M-Audio sound adapter cards and volume controls and headphone and microphone jacks at the front of the case.
 Array models are PS/2 Servers with support for RAID.

Models

Main line

PS/2 Server

Portables

Related systems

See also
 List of third-party Micro Channel computers

References

IBM lists
 
IBM PS 2 models